The 1957–58 season was Manchester City's 56th season of competitive football and 41st season in the top division of English football. In addition to the First Division, the club competed in the FA Cup.

First Division

League table

Results summary

References

External links

Manchester City F.C. seasons